Jack Edwards may refer to:

Sports

Association football
Jack Edwards (footballer, born 1867) (1867–1960), English footballer for Preston North End
Jack Edwards (footballer, born 1876) (1876–?), Welsh footballer for Aberystwyth Town
Jack Edwards (footballer, born 1921) (1921–2009), English footballer for Rotherham United
Jack Edwards (footballer, born 1924) (1924–1978), English footballer for Southampton and Nottingham Forest
Jack Edwards (footballer, born 1929) (1929–2014), Welsh footballer and manager for Crystal Palace, Exeter City and Torquay United
Jack Edwards (soccer), Australian soccer player

Australian rules football
Jack Edwards (Australian footballer, born 1931) (1931–2014),  Australian rules footballer for North Melbourne
Jack Edwards (Australian footballer, born 1934), Australian rules footballer for Footscray

Cricket
Jack Edwards (cricketer, born 1860) (1860–1911), Australian cricketer
Jack Edwards (cricketer, born 2000), Australian cricketer

Other people
Jack Edwards (British politician) (1882–1960), Liberal MP for Aberavon
Jack Edwards (British Army soldier) (1918–2006), former British WWII serviceman and a Japanese POW survivor who lived in Hong Kong
Jack Edwards (American politician) (1928–2019), member of the U.S. House of Representatives from Alabama
Jack Edwards (sportscaster) (born 1957), American NESN sports broadcaster

Fictional
Jack Edwards (EastEnders)

See also
Jackie Edwards (disambiguation)
John Edwards (disambiguation)